Europe Asia Business School is a B-School founded by Industrialist and Academicians including Alumni of Harvard and Cambridge Universities. 
The initiative is funded by Venture Capital funds- Intel Capital (the Venture Capital arm of Intel Corp) and Helion Ventures.

Academic Programmes

The school offers the following academic programmes ;

 1 year full-time Post Graduate Programme in Management (PGPM) offered in collaboration with their partner international universities;
 2 year Part-Time (Weekend) Executive MBA for working professionals;
 Train to Grow (TOG); and,

Under Corporate programmes ;
 Management Development Programs (MDP)
 STEP UP (Source, Train, Evaluate, Place)Program.

Happenings, student activities and achievements
 The highest placement recorded in 2010 is INR 12.8 lakhs and 2009 is INR 9.67 lakhs.
 EABS is the first college in India to have 'virtual presence through second life'. The whole campus has been developed and is maintained by the students themselves.
 'MANDI', an annual workshop done by the students to employ their theoretical knowledge into practical use by selling toys made by an NGO on the streets of Pune. The money generated from this exercise went for the education of the underprivileged children.
 Europe Asia Business School Students are a part of the NGO 'Open Mind Trust' initiative called "Question Box".
 Santosh Putchala of PGP 2009-10 has published a technical paper in "AI & Society" international journal from Springer Business Media. This is being featured as the 'only paper from Asia Pacific Region' to appear in the published issue. This is the first international level paper produced by a student at the school and received comments from researchers and academicians from prestigious institutes like MIT.
 'Mandi - 2009' was featured in the Indian express paper.
 EABS organizes annual 'Unleash The CEO', the young CEO hunt contest in beginning of every year.
 EABS Students adopted 44 Micro-Enterprises in Pune in 2011 and 15 in 2010 (urban small vendors) for the project called Microscope. The story appeared at World-Entrepreneurship-Forum website in France.

Unleash The CEO
Unleash The CEO is an annual event organized pan-India by Europe Asia Business School. This is a young CEO hunt contest held in beginning of every year. The event is structured to test contestants' skills at different simulated stages as in real time career i.e. entering a good organization, then proving oneself to be a successful manager and eventually proving oneself to be a worthy of the CEO role. Different stages of the event include online screening round, business simulation and a case study (written followed by a Group Discussion) designed by Harvard Business Publishing (knowledge partner for the event), an all functional skill test, caselet based press conference and Personal Interview with the jury members (CEOs/CFOs from renowned organizations across the globe).

Following is the detail of the event so far -

References

External links
 EABS website 

Business schools in Maharashtra
Universities and colleges in Pune
Educational institutions established in 2008
2008 establishments in Maharashtra